Donald Duck is the Dutch flagship weekly Disney comics magazine, first published on October 25, 1952.

The magazine was originally published by the staff of the women's magazine Margriet, and every Margriet subscriber received the first issue for free. The comic is mainly aimed at younger children, and includes a letters page from readers. In 2019, the magazine reached its 3,500th issue.

Readership 
A 2014 study by Nationaal Onderzoek Multimedia of comic book reading among Dutch children ages 6–12 during the past year, placed Donald Duck (81%) as most read comic book, and Donald Duck Extra (44%) as second place, before Kidsweek (33%), Nickelodeon magazine (33%), Tina (25%) and National Geographic junior (33%). In 2014 it was read by 1.6 million Dutch citizens above the age of 13, out of which 940.000 men and 660.000 women. In 2008, it was the most read magazine among Dutch students (10%).

Media attention 
In 2012, Dutch prime minister Mark Rutte appeared in Donald Duck. Rutte said that he was honored; he was a big fan during his youth. In 2013, Donald Duck became a museum guard and was chased down canals, in honor of the reopening of the Rijksmuseum and the 400 year anniversary of the Canals of Amsterdam.

References

External links

 Weekblad Donald Duck at Duckipedia

1952 establishments in the Netherlands
Children's magazines published in the Netherlands
Donald Duck comics
Disney comics titles
Comics magazines published in the Netherlands
Dutch-language magazines
1952 comics debuts
Weekly magazines published in the Netherlands
Magazines established in 1952
Magazines published in Amsterdam